Huang Yu-cheng (born 16 September 1953) is a Taiwanese politician. He was the Minister of the Hakka Affairs Council of the Executive Yuan from 20 May 2008 until 1 July 2014.

Hakka Affairs Council ministry

Ministry resignation
On 1 July 2014, Huang resigned from the ministerial post so that he could spend more time with his family, saying that since the first day he became the minister, he never had the time to have dinner with his family at home.

See also
 Taiwanese Hakka

References

Taiwanese politicians of Hakka descent
Living people
Politicians of the Republic of China on Taiwan from Miaoli County
Government ministers of Taiwan
Kuomintang politicians in Taiwan
1952 births
National Taipei University of Education alumni